The 1400s BC is a decade which lasted from 1409 BC to 1400 BC.

Events and trends

 April 16, 1409 BC Lunar Saros 38 begins.
 1400 BC—Palace of Minos destroyed by fire.
 1400 BC—Estimation: Thebes, capital of Egypt becomes the largest city of the world, taking the lead from Memphis in Egypt.
 c. 1400 BC—Assyrians became very powerful.
 c. Beginning of Mycenaean era.
 c. 1400 BC—The center of political and cultural power in the Aegean has shifted from Crete to mainland Greece, which at that time is home to wealthy warrior-kings.
 c. 1400 BC – 1350 BC – Garden of Nebamum (Pond in a Garden) wall painting from the tomb of Nebamum, Thebes. Eighteenth dynasty of Egypt. It is now kept in The British Museum, London.
 c. 1400 BC — Lion Gate at Hattushash (near modern Boghazkeui, Turkey) is made.
 c. 1400 BC – 1200 BC—Two women with a child, found in the palace at Mycenae, Greece, are made. It is now at National Archaeological Museum of Athens.
 Linear A reaches its peak of popularity.
 The height of the Canaanite town of Ugarit.

References